Sami Sarjula (born 30 July 1978 in Kangasniemi) is a Finnish actor. Sarjula has previously been the leading dancer in the Scandinavian Hunks.

From 2004 to 2013, Sarjula starred as Ossi Puolakka in a Finnish drama series Salatut elämät.

In 2007, Sarjula was a competitor in Tanssii tähtien kanssa, the Finnish version of Dancing with the Stars, but was eliminated in the semifinals.

References

1978 births
Finnish male television actors
Finnish male voice actors
Living people
People from Kangasniemi
Finnish male dancers
21st-century Finnish male actors